Richard Boleslawski (born Bolesław Ryszard Srzednicki; February 4, 1889 – January 17, 1937) was a Polish theatre and film director, actor and teacher of acting.

Biography
Richard Boleslawski was born Bolesław Ryszard Srzednicki on February 4, 1889, in Mohyliv-Podilskyi, in the Russian Empire to an ethnic Polish family of Catholic faith. He graduated from the Tver Cavalry Officers School. He trained as an actor at the First Studio of the Moscow Art Theatre under Konstantin Stanislavski and his assistant Leopold Sulerzhitsky, where he was introduced to the 'system'.

During World War I, Boleslawski fought as a cavalry lieutenant on the tsarist Russian side until the fall of the Russian Empire. He left Russia after the October Revolution of 1917 for his native Poland, where he directed his first movies. As his birth name was difficult to pronounce, he took the name Ryszard Bolesławski. His Miracle at the Vistula (Cud nad Wisłą) was a semi-documentary about the miraculous victory of the Poles at the Vistula River over the superior Soviet Russian forces during the Polish-Soviet War of 1919–1921.

Boleslawski was married at least three times and had a son with his last wife, Norma.

Boleslawski acted in Love One Another (Die Gezeichneten, 1922), a German silent film directed by Danish director Carl Theodor Dreyer. In September 1922, he made his way to New York City, where, now known as "Richard Boleslawski" (the English spelling of his name), he began to teach Stanislavski's 'system' (which, in the US, developed into Method acting) with fellow émigré Maria Ouspenskaya. In 1923, he founded the American Laboratory Theatre in New York. Among his students were Lee Strasberg, Stella Adler and Harold Clurman, who were all founding members of the Group Theatre (1931–1940), the first American acting ensemble to utilize Stanislavski's techniques.

Offered a contract to direct Hollywood films, Boleslawski made several significant films with some of the major stars of the day, until his death a few weeks short of his 48th birthday, on January 17, 1937. He is interred in the Calvary Cemetery, East Los Angeles.

Hugh Walpole, who worked with Boleslawski on the script for Les Misérables (1935), dedicated his 1937 novel John Cornelius to him with an In Memoriam poem.

For his contribution to the motion picture industry, Boleslawski has a star on the Hollywood Walk of Fame at 7021 Hollywood Blvd.

Filmography
Films directed by Richard Boleslavsky (also credited as Ryszard Bolesławski and Richard Boleslawski):

in Russia
Tri Vstrechi
Khlieb (1918)

in Poland
Bohaterstwo Polskiego Skauta (1920)
Cud nad Wisłą (The Miracle at the Vistula) (1921)

in the United States

The Grand Parade (1930), choreography only
Treasure Girl (1930 short)
The Last of the Lone Wolf (1930)
The Gay Diplomat (1930)
Rasputin and the Empress (1932), teaming Ethel, John, and Lionel Barrymore
Storm at Daybreak (1933)
Beauty for Sale (1933)
Fugitive Lovers (1934)
Men in White (1934) starring Clark Gable
Hollywood Party (1934)
Operator 13 (1934)
The Painted Veil (1934), featuring Greta Garbo
Clive of India (1935)
Les Misérables (1935), with Fredric March and Charles Laughton
Metropolitan (1935)
O'Shaughnessy's Boy (1935)
Three Godfathers (1936)
The Garden of Allah (1936), starring Marlene Dietrich and Charles Boyer
Theodora Goes Wild (1936), featuring Irene Dunne
The Last of Mrs. Cheyney (1937) starring Joan Crawford and William Powell (Boleslavsky died before this film was completed)

Books
 The Way of the Lancer (1932; about the battles of Polish Uhlans in Russia)
 Lances Down (1932)
 Boleslavsky, Richard. 1933 Acting: the First Six Lessons. New York: Theatre Arts, 1987. . (1933)
  New Features In Acting  (1935)

References

Sources
 Benedetti, Jean. 1999. Stanislavski: His Life and Art. Revised edition. Original edition published in 1988. London: Methuen. .

External links
Kulesza, Marek (2018), Ryszard Bolesławski at the Encyklopedia teatru polskiego (Polish)

1889 births
1937 deaths
People from Mohyliv-Podilskyi
People from Mogilyovsky Uyezd (Podolian Governorate)
People who emigrated to escape Bolshevism
People from the Russian Empire of Polish descent
Polish film directors
Polish theatre directors
Polish male stage actors
Polish emigrants to the United States
American film directors
English-language film directors
Russian military personnel of World War I
Puławy Legion personnel
Burials at Calvary Cemetery (Los Angeles)